Manj-e Baraftab (also Romanized as Manj-e Barāftāb, Monj-e Barāftāb and Monj-e Barr Āftāb) is a village in Manj Rural District, Manj District, Lordegan County, Chaharmahal and Bakhtiari Province, Iran. At the 2006 census, its population was 495, in 96 families.

References 

Populated places in Lordegan County